The Arab Islamic Republic was a proposed unification of Tunisia and Libya in 1974, agreed upon by Libyan head of state Muammar Gaddafi and Tunisian President Habib Bourguiba. Additional countries—Morocco and Algeria—were later included in  the proposal, which was never implemented.

Regional context
The attempted merger between Tunisia and Libya took place in a historical and regional context. Maghrebi regional politics played a role embedded into the constitutions of Tunisia, Morocco and Algeria is the ideal of Maghrebi unity, however contradicting this ideal is the competing interests of Morocco and Algeria, the region's two major powers. According to Tunisian scholar Habib Slim, "if there were only Algeria and not Morocco, or Morocco and not Algeria, there could never have been a Maghrib. The major power would have swallowed us all up. To have the Maghrib you need those two rival powers competing with each other in the region". Thus attempts at unification within the Maghreb were more often than not the means by which to counterbalance one or both of the region's major powers.

Additionally, Pan-Arabism influenced the politics of the Arab world. Muammar Gaddafi was a well-known proponent of this ideology and had thus worked to achieve union with several Arab states such as Egypt, Syria, Sudan and Tunisia. He also sought union with Chad. Tunisia was initially suspicious of Gaddafi's intentions, but the Libyan leader visited Tunis in February 1971 and December 1972, and, in a rally in that city during the latter visit, spoke of supporting a union between Libya and Tunisia.  Hearing the speech by Gaddafi live at his home over the radio, President Bourguiba rushed to the rally where, after he let Gaddafi finish, he took to the stage and denounced the idea that "the Arabs had ever been united, dismissed all of [Gaddafi's] ideas about rapid Arab unity, and even took the Libyans to task for what he described as their own lack of national unity and their backwardness".  Close Libyan-Egyptian ties troubled Maghrebi leaders who feared the proximity of Egypt on their eastern borders and thus worked to pull Libya away from Egyptian influence. At the fourth annual Non-Aligned Movement conference in Algiers, Bourguiba called for the unification of Algeria, Tunisia and Libya to form a "United States of North Africa", a move which he qualified by proposing it take place in stages over an "unspecified period of time".

Djerba Declaration
On 11 January 1974, the Djerba Declaration was signed by Bourgiba and Gaddafi, which committed the two states to becoming a single state, to be named the Arab Islamic Republic.  The agreement was signed on the island of Djerba and thus, is also known as the Djerba Declaration or the Djerba Accord. Referendums were scheduled in each country to vote on the issue. The spontaneous tactic in trying to gain unity with another state on the part of Gaddafi displays a different approach than the previous union attempt with Egypt, where long negotiations did not work out.  It is possible that Bourguiba was the original pursuant of a union between Libya and Tunisia, as Bourguiba wanted a regional ally and also wanted to "wean Libya away from Egypt".

The union agreement was a surprise to observers, as previously it was thought that Bourguiba had not supported the idea, in part due to tensions brought about by the speech by Gaddafi in Tunis in December 1972. This change in support could also have been influenced by the presence of 30,000 Tunisians working in Libya at the time and helping the Tunisian economy.  As Tunisia suffered from a labour surplus, a foreign debt of one billion and a lack of natural resources, a closer economic union with the resource rich but labour poor Libya would have been an attractive alternative. Why Bourguiba decided to agree to the union is not completely known, but it is known that the Djerba agreement was seen with suspicion by Tunisians and Algerians, as well as outside these states both regionally and internationally.

The Arab Islamic Republic was supposed to have "a single constitution, a single army, and a single President."  Under the agreement, Bourguiba was to be president, but Gaddafi wanted to keep the Ministry of Defence.  Prior to the Djerba Declaration multiple agreements dealing with singular, separate issues had previously been arranged between the two states on "trade, customs duties, investment, regulation for migrant workers, social security, and the creation of a joint shipping company", but the agreements were not publicly noted as pursuing a union of the two states. Support for the unity beyond Bourguiba came from others within the Tunisian government, thinking that it would further benefit the Tunisian economy; the most prominent supporter was Tunisian Foreign Minister Mohamed Masmoudi.

The length of time the union lasted is contentious, with one source saying it lasted one month, while another says it lasted only a single day and a third indicating it lasted a few days.   What is known though is that Tunisia reconsidered the deal soon after signing it, as Tunisia was supportive of economic benefits gained from the union, but not for giving up Tunisian sovereignty.  Thus, as the Tunisian socialist PSD party resisted the union plans due to their view that the arrangement was not clear enough and did not include how political institutions would be structured, Bourguiba rescinded on his decision to form the Arab Islamic Republic.  The referendum in Tunisia was postponed, as announced on January 12, 1974. Following Bourguiba's removal of Tunisia from the agreement, the biggest supporter of the union, Tunisian Foreign Minister Masmoudi was fired.

Before the agreement was dissolved, Gaddafi had thought that one merger within the region would lead to regional unification and ultimately unification of the Arab world.  Following the union's inception and fallout, Bourguiba's judgement and capacity to lead Tunisia was questioned after he announced the union with Libya.  Bechir Ben Yahmed, a Tunisian journalist noted, "For me, he [Bourguiba] died in January, 1974, in Djerba, when during several minutes of face-to-face with Gaddafi, he signed, on hotel stationary, that famous charter of union."

Failure of the Djerba Declaration
As a consequence of the ideological differences, there was also a considerable divergence as to what the merger would look like.  As understood by Bourguiba, the states themselves would not dissipate, but rather their borders would become "cooperatively permeable" through "functional integration", in a similar manner to the contemporary Arab Maghreb Union, formed over a decade later.  Conversely, Gaddafi was more interested in a complete merging of Libya and Tunisia into the Arab Islamic Republic.  He saw Libya as a revolutionary movement rather than a territorial state. Gaddafi felt that they were one people, and that the borders were only a product of the ruling elites and imperialist division by conquerors.

Finally, there were the regional political difficulties.  As has been mentioned before, Libyan-Egyptian relations were steadily deteriorating following 1973. In light of the reduced Egyptian threat, Algeria felt it no longer necessary and even undesirable to merge with Libya and was not in favour of Tunisia doing so either. Thus, within twenty four hours of the Republic's announcement, Algeria threatened Tunisia with military intervention if Tunisia went ahead with the unification.  There were also accusations of Tunisian foreign ministers being bribed by Libya.  Whatever the case may be, the unification with Libya never ended up happening and relations between the two countries steadily deteriorated.

See also
 Arab Maghreb Union, an economic and political union between Maghreb states
 Federation of Arab Republics, a weak union between Libya, Egypt, and Syria around the same time
 Pan-Arabism
 United Arab Republic
 Arab Federation

References

External links
Newspaper bulletin for the referendum on the Arab Islamic Republic
Map of the Arabic Islamic Republic

1974 in Libya
1974 in Tunisia
Arab nationalism in Libya
Arab nationalism in Tunisia
Arab republics
Former Arab states
Former countries in Africa
Libya–Tunisia relations
Pan-Arabism
Proposed political unions